George Porter (1920–2002) was a British chemist and Nobel prize winner

George Porter may also refer to:
George Bryan Porter (1791–1834), U.S. politician
George Richardson Porter (1792–1852), British statistician
George Porter (architect) (died 1856), British architect
Sir George Porter, 1st Baronet (1822–1895), British surgeon, see Porter baronets
George Porter (cricketer) (1861–1908), English cricketer
George Porter (British politician) (1884–1973), British Labour MP for Leeds Central, 1945–1955
George Porter (New Zealand politician) (1921–1998), New Zealand architect, company director and politician
Barry Porter (George Barrington Porter, 1939–1996), British politician
George Porter Jr. (born 1947), American musician
George Porter (footballer) (born 1992), English professional footballer
George Porter (athlete) (born 1966), American athlete
George Porter (rugby union) (born 1989), English rugby union player
George Porter (Royalist) (1622–1683), royalist army officer of the First English Civil War
George Porter (conspirator) (1659–1728), English soldier and conspirator
George Porter (Upper Canada), early settler in Upper Canada, said to have constructed the first house in York, expanded into Berkeley House, York, Upper Canada 
George Porter (mariner) (1786–1872), mariner and early pioneer of South Australia
George E. Porter, American sound engineer